Ennomosia is a genus of moths of the family Crambidae.

Species
Ennomosia atribasalis 
Ennomosia basalis (Hampson, 1897)
Ennomosia geometridalis Amsel, 1956

References

Pyraustinae
Crambidae genera
Taxa named by Hans Georg Amsel